(The Defenceless) is a 1939 Norwegian drama film directed by Leif Sinding, based on a book by Gabriel Scott and starring Georg Richter and Karin Meyer. Albert (Richter) is placed in an orphanage, where he is treated like a slave. He tries to escape, but is caught. Then a young girl, Gunda (Eva Lunde), appears.

External links
 
 
 De vergeløse at the Norwegian Film Institute

1939 films
1939 drama films
Films directed by Leif Sinding
Norwegian drama films
Norwegian black-and-white films
1930s Norwegian-language films